P'arsman IV (sometimes Latinized as Pharasmanes), of the Chosroid Dynasty, was the king of Iberia (Kartli, eastern Georgia) from 406 to 409.

According to the medieval Georgian chronicles, he was the son of King Varaz-Bakur II and the daughter of Trdat of Iberia. Characterized as a pious monarch and an exceptional warrior, he is reported to have rebelled against the Iranian hegemony and have withheld paying tribute to the shah. He is also credited with the construction of Bolnisi.

P’arsman is identified by some scholars with the Pharasmanes of the Syriac Vita Petri Iberi who was a brother of Osdukhtia, the paternal grandmother of Peter the Iberian, a well-known Georgian theologian and one of the leaders of anti-Chalcedonian movement in the Eastern Roman Empire. Pharasmanes enjoyed a leading position at the Roman court and held the rank of a magister militum under Emperor Arcadius until being accused of committing adultery with the empress Eudoxia. He escaped back to Iberia where he became king and encouraged the White Huns to attack the Roman frontiers. He was succeeded by his brother, Mihrdat.

References

Chosroid kings of Iberia
5th-century monarchs in Asia
Magistri militum
Georgians from the Sasanian Empire